Tall Heydari (also Romanized as Tall Ḩeydarī) is a village in Jolgah Rural District, in the Central District of Jahrom County, Fars Province, Iran. At the 2006 census, its population was 11, in 5 families.

References 

Populated places in Jahrom County